Ek Hazarachi Note (1000 Rupee Note) is a 2014 Varhadi and Marathi-language Indian film directed by Shrihari Sathe It stars Usha Naik, Sandeep Pathak and 
Shrikant Yadav The film was released on 9 May 2014 to positive reviews, and won the Silver Peacock - Best Feature Film at the 45th International Film Festival of India.

Cast
 Usha Naik as Budhi, the old lady
 Sandeep Pathak as Sudama, the goatherd
 Shrikant Yadav as Sub-inspector
 Ganesh Yadav as Uttamrao Jadhav, the politician running for re-election
 Pooja Nayak as Sudama's wife
 Devendra Gaikwad as Constable Shinde

Synopsis
During a political rally in a small village in Maharashtra, India, a poor old woman named Budhi receives a largess of several 1000 Rupee notes from a politician. She goes shopping to the nearby market town with her neighbor but fate has other plans for them.

Critical Reception 

Ek Hazarachi Note critical acclaim The Times of India gave 3 stars (out of 5) saying that Keeping every minute detail of the story intact, Shrihari has struck gold with his first film. The cinematography is classy and the background score helps magnifying the beaty of every scene and emotion on the actors’ faces. But the ace in the pack is Usha Naik whose mind-blowing performance is sure to evoke sympathy for her character in the viewers’ minds. Sandeep Pathak too delivers with excellence and it is good to see him moving away from his stereotyped comic roles.
Sankhayan Ghosh of Indian Express wrote that "In the film, rather than the protagonist taking drastic decisions, things happen to her. Indian rural society is passive and people in power control their lives. I found it challenging to tell the story of a passive protagonist,"

Awards
International
Silver Peacock - Best Feature Film at 45th IFFI 2014
Special Jury Award at 45th IFFI 2014

State Awards
 Best Film (1st place) Maharashtra State Film Awards 2015
 Best Director (1st place) Maharashtra State Film Awards 2015
 Best Picture, Ischia Film Festival 2015 (Italy)
 Best Marathi Film Screenplay, Pune International Film Festival 2015
 Best Marathi Film Actor, Pune International Film Festival,2015 
 Best Actress (Special Mention), Maharashtra State Film Awards 2015
 Best Actress, 21st Life OK Screen Awards 2015
 Best Supporting Actor (Male), Maharashtra State Film Awards 2015

References

External links
 
 

2014 films
2010s Marathi-language films